Asa Singh Mastana (1926–1999) was a Punjabi musician and singer best known for lending his voice to the hit Bollywood film Heer, and singing jugni and Heer-genre of folk songs, which recount the tales of Heer Ranjha by poet Waris Shah. He became popular in the 1940s, by the mid-1960s, when state-run All India Radio started promoting folk musicians, this made him, along with Surinder Kaur and Kuldeep Manak singers of cult status.

His well-known songs, among others "Balle Ni Panjaab Diye Sher Bachiye", "Doli Charhdeyan Marian Heer Cheekaan" and "Kali Teri Gut", have served as templates for later Punjabi musicians His great work also expands to singing sad songs like "Jadon Meri Arthi Utha Ke Chalan Ge". He was mostly paired with Surinder Kaur or Prakash Kaur for singing many old folk songs of Punjab.

In 1985, he was awarded the Padma Shri by the Government of India.

Discography
 Best of Asa Singh Mastana and Surinder Kaur
 Hits of Asa Singh Mastana & Pushpa Hans - Recorded Live in the UK (1980)
 Heer
 Mastana Masti Wich
 "Mutiare Jana Door Pya" (1970)
 Sarke Sarke Jandiye Mutiare Ni

References

External links
 
Asa Singh Mastana Albums
Obit in Indian Express

1927 births
1999 deaths
Indian male folk singers
Punjabi-language singers
Singers from Punjab, India
Recipients of the Padma Shri in arts
20th-century Indian singers
20th-century Indian male singers